Denis Gennadievich Serikov is a Russian media manager responsible for co-creating several popular radio stations in Russia, including Russian version of international radio brand NRJ. Holds the position of the Producer General of the major media conglomerate called Gazprom Media Radio.

Early years 
Born in Bashkortostan in 1973.

In 1996—1998 played guitar in prominent Russian rock band called Mongol Shuudan.

Radios 
"Open Radio" (since 1998, editor, program director)

"First Popular Radio" (since 2003, director)

NRJ Radio aka "Radio Energy" (since 2006, co-creator of Russian version of NRJ franchise originating from France). In 2020, the radio was the one which selected out of Internet music releases a track called "Roses" remixed by Kazakhstani DJ called Imanbek. In 2021 the track received Grammy Award.

"Radio Next" (co-creator)

"Radio Romantika" (2010, editor-in-chief)

"Comedy Radio" and "Relax FM" (producer general, 2014). 

"Like FM" (since 2015, creator)

Holds several sectoral awards of Russian mass media/radio community. Many of the radio stations Serikov was involved in, hold top positions in popularity ratings of Russian audience.

References 

Russian radio personalities
Year of birth missing (living people)
Living people